Waiting for the Barbarians is a 2019 drama film directed by Ciro Guerra in his English-language directorial debut. The film is based on the 1980 novel of the same name by J. M. Coetzee. It stars Mark Rylance, Johnny Depp, Robert Pattinson, Gana Bayarsaikhan, and Greta Scacchi.

The film premiered at the Venice Film Festival on September 6, 2019. It was released on August 7, 2020, by Samuel Goldwyn Films. It received a lukewarm critical response.

Plot
The Magistrate (Mark Rylance) manages an outpost on the desert frontiers of an unnamed Empire. His careful management has kept the peace for many years and there are only minor misunderstandings. All that changes with the arrival of Colonel Joll (Johnny Depp), who is acting as part of a mysterious plan set in motion by the centre of the empire. The Magistrate tries his best, but Colonel Joll remains antagonistic.  Colonel Joll insists on interrogating an innocent man and his nephew for sheep rustling. Colonel Joll is determined to follow his process for getting the truth, which requires brutal torture. The Magistrate does not understand Joll, or his methods, or his goals. Colonel Joll then forces the tortured nephew to escort him and a detachment of soldiers to his tribe, where numerous women and elderly men are taken into custody as "prisoners of war".

Colonel Joll departs the next day, which prompts the Magistrate to release the prisoners immediately and send them home. A few months later, a former prisoner with two broken ankles (Gana Bayarsaikhan) is seen panhandling in the streets. The Magistrate gives her food and shelter, and attempts to heal her broken ankles. Some of the soldiers mistake this act of kindness for an act of lust, believing that the Magistrate intends to keep the girl as a concubine. The Magistrate learns of all the tortures and hardships the girl has gone through, including the death of her father. He asks her to stay at the fort, but promises to return her to her people if she does not wish to stay. The girl chooses the latter.

After a long and arduous journey through the desert, the Magistrate approaches the nomads in the mountains hoping to restore relations with them, but the nomads are upset and only the Magistrate's reputation and the knowledge that he helped one of their own keeps the tribesmen from butchering him and his escorts. The Magistrate returns to find Officer Mandel (Robert Pattinson), Colonel Joll's underling, has been assigned to command the fort. Officer Mandel immediately takes the Magistrate into custody, accuses him of treachery, and strips him of his office.

The Magistrate is eventually released, but when he tries to help "prisoners of war" being mistreated by Mandel's soldiers, the soldiers beat and abuse him. He is then brought in for questioning and accused of consorting with the enemy for helping the nomad girl. The Magistrate is publicly shamed and has his home and possessions confiscated, while Colonel Joll departs with a large force to wipe out the mountain nomads. The Magistrate, now disheveled, poor, homeless, and ostracized by his countrymen, is taken in by one of his former servants (Greta Scacchi), who feeds and clothes him.

Meanwhile, it is revealed that Colonel Joll's actions hace resulted in the unification of the dispersed nomadic tribes into a single "barbarian" army. One morning, a horse carrying the corpse of one of Colonel Joll's men walks into the fort. Officer Mandel walks away in fear and quickly resigns his command. The local imperial colonists feel betrayed and abandoned, fearing that the incoming army will take revenge on them without any soldiers to man the fort. As Officer Mandel and his men depart, the Magistrate takes advantage of the chaos to move back into his original home. Soon enough, Colonel Joll returns with only a handful of survivors in a desperate state. The Magistrate goes to see a pensive and defeated Colonel Joll sitting in his carriage, seeming completely detached from reality while his soldiers hastily gather provisions and horses. As the colonists angrily pelt them with stones, the Colonel and his men hurriedly depart the fort later that evening.

The Magistrate returns to a town bereft of young men, where boys play-pretend to stand guard around scarecrows dressed as soldiers by the gates of the fort. While he thinks of the nomad girl living in the desert, a shadow approaches the Magistrate, who is standing alone in the courtyard, and a cloud of dust appears on the horizon - dust thrown up by an immense army of nomadic warriors headed towards the fort.

Cast
Mark Rylance as The Magistrate
Johnny Depp as Colonel Joll
Robert Pattinson as Officer Mandel
Gana Bayarsaikhan as "The Girl"
Greta Scacchi as Mai
David Dencik as The Clerk
Sam Reid as The Lieutenant
Harry Melling as Garrison Soldier 4
Bill Milner as Garrison Soldier 5

Production
It was announced in October 2016 that filmmaker Ciro Guerra was working on an adaptation of the novel Waiting for the Barbarians, which would see him make his English language debut. Mark Rylance was announced to star in the film.

In May 2018, Johnny Depp was stated to have contacted Guerra in regard to appearing in the film. Robert Pattinson was revealed as being cast in the film as well.  Depp confirmed in October he would star in the film, and revealed filming was to begin at the end of the month in Morocco, later pinpointed as being October 29. Production concluded on December 14, 2018.

Release
Waiting for the Barbarians had its world premiere at the Venice Film Festival on September 6, 2019. Samuel Goldwyn Films acquired U.S. distribution rights to the film, and released it on August 7, 2020.

Reception

Box office
By March 2021, the film grossed $764,815 in the worldwide box office.

Critical
The website's critics consensus reads: "Admirable in theory but disappointing in execution, Waiting for the Barbarians struggles to turn strong performances and worthy themes into affecting drama." On Metacritic, the film holds a rating of 52 out of 100, based on 19 critics, indicating "mixed or average reviews".

References

External links
 
 

2019 films
2010s English-language films
American drama films
Italian drama films
English-language Italian films
Films shot in Morocco
Samuel Goldwyn Films films
J. M. Coetzee
Films directed by Ciro Guerra
2019 drama films
2010s American films